

Gucci is an Italian surname. It may be refer to:

People

Given name
 Gucci Westman (born 1971), American makeup artist.

Surname
 Alexandra Gucci (married Zarini, b. 1985), children's rights activist(*)
 Aldo Gucci (1905-1990), Italian businessman and fashion designer(*)
 Guccio Gucci (1881-1953), Italian businessman and fashion designer, founder of the fashion brand and fashion house Gucci
 Mateo Gucci (1500-1550), Renaissance architect
 Maurizio Gucci (1948-1995), Italian businessman(*)
 Niccolò Gucci (born 1990), Italian footballer
 Paolo Gucci (1931-1995), Italian businessman and fashion designer(*)
 Patricia Gucci (b. 1963), Italian businesswoman(*)
 Patrizia Gucci (née Reggiani, b. 1948), ex-wife of Maurizio Gucci, later hirer of his murder
 Rodolfo Gucci (1912-1983), Italian actor and entrepreneur(*)
(*) — lineal descendant of Guccio Gucci

Nickname
 Reza Ghoochannejhad (b. 1987), Iranian footballer

Stage name
 Gucci Mane (b. 1980), American rapper

Business
 Gucci (House of Gucci), an Italian luxury fashion brand and fashion house.
 Gucci Hotel, a boutique hotel in Dubai, United Arab Emirates

Entertainment
 "Gucci Flip Flops", a 2017 song by Bhad Bhabie featuring american rapper Lil Yachty
 "Gucci Gang", a 2017 song by Lil Pump
 "Gucci Gucci", a 2011 song by Kreayshawn
 Gucci Gucci Tour, a 2011 tour concert tour by Kreayshawn
 House of Gucci, an American 2021 drama film  about Patrizia Reggiani and Maurizio Gucci

See also
 Guccio, a given name and surname
 Guci, a type of Chinese drum song
 Guchi, West Azerbaijan, Iran
 Guchi, Hormozgan, Iran